Neige Dias and Patricia Medrado were the defending champions but they competed with different partners that year, Dias with Bettina Fulco and Medrado with Cláudia Monteiro.

Dias and Fulco lost in the quarterfinals to Amy Frazier and Luanne Spadea, as did Medrado and Monteiro to Jill Hetherington and Mercedes Paz.

Katrina Adams and Cheryl Jones won in the final 6–4, 4–6, 6–4 against Hetherington and Paz.

Seeds
Champion seeds are indicated in bold text while text in italics indicates the round in which those seeds were eliminated.

 Andrea Betzner /  Isabel Cueto (quarterfinals)
 Jill Hetherington /  Mercedes Paz (final)
 Lea Antonoplis /  Emilse Raponi-Longo (first round)
 Neige Dias /  Bettina Fulco (quarterfinals)

Draw

References
 1987 Brasil Open Doubles Draw

Women's Doubles
Doubles